PMA may refer to:

Organizations
 Pacific Maritime Association
 Pacific Missionary Aviation
 Palestine Monetary Authority
 Pakistan Marine Academy
 Pakistan Military Academy
 Presentation of Mary Academy
 People's Municipal Assembly
 Philadelphia Museum of Art
 Philippine Military Academy
 Phi Mu Alpha Sinfonia
 Photo Marketing Association
 PMA Group, a lobbying firm in the US
 Power Marketing Administration
 Power Matters Alliance, a consortium promoting a wireless charging standard
 President's Management Agenda, US
 Produce Marketing Association
 Publishers Marketing Association
 Puckapunyal Military Area, Australia
 Pemba Airport (Tanzania) (IATA airport code)

Science and technology
 para-Methoxyamphetamine, an amphetamine derivative
 Phorbol 12-myristate 13-acetate, a transient PKC stimulator
 Phosphomolybdic acid, used as a thin-layer chromatography stain
 Poly(methyl acrylate), a synthetic acrylate polymer
 Principles of Mathematical Analysis, a real analysis textbook
 Progressive muscular atrophy, a neurodegenerative muscle-wasting disease
 Propidium monoazide, a fluorescent dye
 Psychomotor agitation, unintentional and purposeless movements accompanying some health conditions (depression, anxiety, and others)

Technology and engineering
 Persistent Management Agent, defined by Broadband Forum WT-318
 phpMyAdmin, management tool of a MySQL database
 Physical Medium Attachment in computer network protocols is a sublayer of physical layer 
 Program Memory Area, of a CDRW
 Pressurized Mating Adapter, for docking a Space Shuttle to the International Space Station
 Post mortem analysis, a technical analysis of a finished project
 Parts Manufacturer Approval, a U.S. government approval for manufacture of aircraft parts
 Premarket approval, a U.S. government approval for medical devices

Humanities
 Positive mental attitude, a philosophy of having an optimistic disposition in every situation
 Post mortem auctoris, a Latin term meaning "after the author's death", most often used in determining copyright
 Professional Master's in Social Sciences and Humanities, a postgraduate academic degree program

Other uses
 Performance Monitoring for Action, a survey held at intervals in Burkina Faso
 "PMA" (song), a 2021 song by All Time Low
 "PMA", a 2012 song by Lower Than Atlantis from their album Changing Tune